The 2021 Arctic Race of Norway was a road cycling stage race that took place between 5 and 8 August 2021. Though the race took place mostly in the Norwegian county of Troms og Finnmark, the race also made a brief appearance in Finland, marking the first time that the race ventured outside of Norway. It was the eighth edition of the Arctic Race of Norway, which was rated as a 2.Pro event on the 2021 UCI Europe Tour and the 2021 UCI ProSeries calendars. This edition was the race's first in the UCI ProSeries; the 2020 edition was expected to feature in the inaugural UCI ProSeries but was cancelled due to the COVID-19 pandemic.

Teams 
Seven UCI WorldTeams, ten UCI ProTeams, one UCI Continental team, and the Norwegian national team made up the nineteen teams that participated in the race.

UCI WorldTeams

 
 
 
 
 
 
 

UCI ProTeams

 
 
 
 
 
 
 
 
 
 

UCI Continental Teams

 

National Teams

 Norway

Route 
The 2021 edition of the race used the same route as the one planned for the cancelled 2020 edition; this route was first revealed on 12 November 2019. On the second stage, the race made its first venture outside of Norway for a stage finish in Kilpisjärvi, Finland.

Stages

Stage 1 
5 August 2021 – Tromsø to Tromsø,

Stage 2 
6 August 2021 – Nordkjosbotn to Storfjord - Kilpisjärvi (Finland),

Stage 3 
7 August 2021 – Finnsnes (Senja) to Målselv (Alpine village),

Stage 4 
8 August 2021 – Gratangen to Harstad,

Classification leadership table 

 On stage 2, Alexander Kristoff, who was second in the points classification, wore the green jersey, because first placed Markus Hoelgaard wore the midnight sun jersey as the leader of the general classification.
 On stage 3, Markus Hoelgaard, who was second in the points classification, wore the green jersey, because first placed Alexander Kristoff wore the midnight sun jersey as the leader of the general classification.

Final classification standings

General classification

Points classification

Mountains classification

Young rider classification

Team classification

Notes

References

External links 
 

2021
Arctic Race of Norway
Arctic Race of Norway
Arctic Race of Norway
Arctic Race of Norway